Anthony Devon Cannon (born December 31, 1984) is a former gridiron football linebacker. Cannon was most recently a member of the Toronto Argonauts of the Canadian Football League. He was drafted by the Detroit Lions in the seventh round of the 2006 NFL Draft. He played college football at Tulane

Professional career

Detroit Lions
Cannon was released by the Lions on March 16, 2009 after three seasons with the team.

Toronto Argonauts
On January 6, 2011, Cannon signed with the Toronto Argonauts of the Canadian Football League. In the 2011 CFL season Cannon accumulated 51 tackles. Cannon was released by the Argonauts prior to the start of the 2012 CFL season

References

External links
Detroit Lions bio
Tulane Green Wave bio

1984 births
Living people
American football linebackers
Tulane Green Wave football players
Detroit Lions players
Players of American football from Pensacola, Florida
Players of Canadian football from Pensacola, Florida
American players of Canadian football